“You Gotta Have Love in Your Heart” is a duet single between Motown singing groups The Supremes and the Four Tops, released as a single from their The Return of the Magnificent 7 album in 1971. The single became a modest charter peaking at #55 on the U.S. Billboard Hot 100 chart and #41 on the U.S. Billboard R&B Singles Chart. The single fared better in the UK, where it reached #25 in the official top 50 single chart. Lead vocals were by the groups' respective lead singers Jean Terrell and Levi Stubbs.

Critical reception
Cashbox published in their July 17, 1976 issue, 'The electrifying combination that made the "Magnificent Seven" is about to return with an album previewed by this delightful rock outing. Side has the power of a cleanly produced dance track and some outstanding vocal fireworks to assure monster receptions. Flip: no info.'

Personnel
Lead vocals by Jean Terrell and Levi Stubbs
Background vocals by Mary Wilson, Cindy Birdsong, Abdul "Duke" Fakir, Lawrence Payton and Renaldo "Obie" Benson
Instrumentation by Los Angeles studio musicians

Charts

References

1971 songs
Four Tops songs
The Supremes songs
Motown singles
Songs written by Dino Fekaris